Diisopropyl tartrate (DIPT) is a diester of tartaric acid. It has a two chiral carbon atoms giving rise to three stereoisomeric variants. It is commonly used in asymmetric synthesis as a catalyst and as chiral building block for pharmaceuticals and agrochemicals.  Its main application is in Sharpless epoxidation, where it serves as a chiral ligand to titanium after reaction with titanium isopropoxide.

References

Tartrate esters
Isopropyl esters